2015 in philosophy

Publications
 Peter Carruthers, The Centered Mind: What the Science of Working Memory Shows Us About the Nature of Human Thought (Oxford University Press). 
 Noam Chomsky - What Kind of Creatures Are We? 
 Michel Foucault - About the Beginning of the Hermeneutics of the Self: Lectures at Dartmouth College, 1980
 Byung-Chul Han - The Burnout Society
 Byung-Chul Han - The Transparency Society
 Michael Shermer - The Moral Arc

Deaths
 February 1 – Irving Singer, US academic and author, 89
 March 1 – Georg Kreisel, Austrian-born mathematical logician, 91
 May 9 – Odo Marquard, German philosopher, 87
 May 27 – Michael Martin, US philosopher and academic, 83
 August 8  – Abner Shimony, US physicist and philosopher of science, 87
 August 12 – Jaakko Hintikka, Finnish philosopher and logician, 86
 December 13 – Benedict Anderson, social historian, cultural critic, Asian studies scholar, writer (Imagined Communities).

References

Philosophy
21st-century philosophy
Philosophy by year